Great Green Wall is the name of three tree-planting initiatives:
 Great Green Wall (Africa)
 Great Green Wall (China)
 Great Green Wall (India)